"I Wanna Be Rich" is a song by American R&B duo Calloway. It was released in 1989 as the third and final single from their debut album All the Way. It is the band's only top-10 hit on the US Billboard Hot 100, reaching number two in May 1990, and it also peaked at number five on the Billboard Hot Black Singles chart. The UK single includes remixes by DJ Timmy Regisford.

Track listing
A-side
 "I Wanna Be Rich" (extended mix) – 7:25
 "I Wanna Be Rich" (7-inch version) – 4:30
 "I Wanna Be Rich" (dub version) – 4:30

B-side
 "I Wanna Be Rich" (12-inch dance mix) – 8:05
 "I Wanna Be Rich" (12-inch dance dub) – 7:58

Charts

Weekly charts

Year-end charts

Certifications

Release history

References

1989 singles
1988 songs
American contemporary R&B songs
Epic Records singles
SOLAR Records singles
Songs written by Reggie Calloway